Lambertz is a surname. Notable people with the surname include:

Andreas Lambertz (born 1984), German footballer
Göran Lambertz (born 1950), Swedish governmental official
Karl-Heinz Lambertz (born 1952), Belgian politician
Maximilian Lambertz (1882–1963), Austrian Albanologist